Dharwad is an administrative district of the state of Karnataka in southern India. The administrative headquarters of the district is the city of Dharwad, also known as Dharwar. Dharwad is located 425 km northwest of Bangalore and 421 km southeast of Pune, on the main highway between Chennai and Pune, the National Highway 4 (NH4).

Before 1997 the district had an area of 13738 km2. In 1997, the new districts of Gadag and Haveri were carved out of Dharwad's former territory, and a portion of Dharwad district was combined with lands formerly part of three other districts to create the new district of Davanagere.

History 
Historical studies show that people from early Paleolithic age inhabited Dharwad district. The district was ruled by various dynasties from the 5th century onwards, Important among them are Badami and Kalyan Chalukyas, Rastrakutas, Vijayanagar, Adilshahi, Mysore kingdom and Peshawas of Pune. Due to the rule of Peshwas, influence of Marathi is seen in the early decades of the 19th century. During the British rule, Dharwad became the divisional headquarter of educational administration and Kannada the vernacular language of the people gained prominence

After India's independence in 1947, the Bombay Presidency was reconstituted as India's Bombay State. In 1956 the southern, Kannada-speaking districts of Bombay State, including Dharwad, were added to Mysore and renamed Karnataka in 1972. Dharwad is home to the Karnataka University and the University of Agricultural Sciences (UAS) as well as numerous other colleges.

In 1962 the erstwhile towns of Dharwad and Hubli were amalgamated to constitute the Hubli-Dharwad Municipal Corporation.

Geographical features 

Dharwad district is situated in the Western sector of the northern half of Karnataka State. The District encompasses an area of 4263 km2 lying between the latitudinal parallels of 15°02' and 15°51' North and longitudes of 73°43' and 75°35' East. The district is bounded on the north by the district of Belgaum, on the east by the district of Gadag, on the south by the district of Haveri and on the west by the district of Uttara Kannada. All these districts, which surround Dharwad district, belong to the state of Karnataka.

Sub Divisions of District (Taluka's)
 Dharwad
 Hubli urban
 Hubli rural
 Kundgol
 Navalgund
 Kalghatgi
 Alnavar
 Annigeri

The District lies approximately 800 m above the sea level, which is why it enjoys a moderate and healthy climate. The District may be divided into 3 natural regions, the Malnad, the Semi-Malnad and the Maidan. These regions on an average receive moderate to heavy rainfall and have dense vegetation. Kalghatagi and Alnavar area in Dharwad taluka in particular receive more rainfall than other talukas of the District.

On the agricultural front, the presence of black soil helps in raising crops like Cotton, Wheat, Ragi, Jowar and Oil seeds and that of red soil is more suitable for paddy.

Important industrial centres 

Hubballi is an important industrial center, with more than 1,000 small and medium scale industries established. They include machine tool industries,Cotton Industries, electrical industries, steel furniture industries, food processing, rubber, leather and leather tanning industries.

Prominent establishments in Dharwad district:

 Tata Motors Ltd.
 Tata Marcopolo Motors Ltd.
 Telco Construction Equipment Company Limited (Telcon).
 Kirloskar Electrical Co. Ltd.
 Microfinish Group of Companies.
 Bhoruka Textile Mill.
 New Government Electric Factory Limited (NGEF).
 Karnataka Milk Federation (KMF).
 Universal group of companies.
 BDK Group of Industries.
 Murudeshwar Ceramics Ltd.
 Kamat Group of Hotels.
 JBM Industries.
 DRT Holidays India.
 Vijayanand Roadlines Ltd. (VRL)
 Vibhava Industries (Monkey 555)

Transportation

Road

NWKRTC (North West Karnataka Road Transport Corporation) is a state run corporation headquartered at Hubballi. There is a good transportation between Hubli, Dharwad, Kalghatgi, Navalgund and Kundgol as NWKRTC and Bendre Nagara Sarige (a consortium of private bus-owners) compete to cater to the large number of commuters between these places daily. 
Bus services from the twin-cities exist to every part of Karnataka and neighbouring states and other destinations. There are many private bus operators who render travel services between Hubli and Bangalore, Mangalore, Pune, Mumbai, Goa and Hyderabad.

Railway

Hubli is the Headquarter of South Western Railways Zone of Indian Railways. There is modest intra-district Railway connectivity. Hubli being an important railway junction has daily trains to Bangalore, Mumbai, Pune, Miraj, Delhi, Hyderabad, Ahmedabad, Vijayawada, Mysore and weekly services to Chennai, Howrah and Thiruvananthapuram.

Air

Hubli Airport (IATA: HBX, ICAO: VOHB) serves the Dharwad district and one of the major operational airports serving northern Karnataka. Currently SpiceJet Airlines have started its operation from Hubli To Bangalore, Mumbai, Hyderabad, Jabalpur, Mangalore, Chennai and IndiGo Airlines have started its operation from Hubli to Ahmedabad, Chennai, Bangalore, Cochin, Goa, Alliance Air operates one flight everyday to the state capital Bangalore, Air India has started its operation from Hubli to Mumbai and Bangalore on Tuesday, Wednesday and Saturday. and Star Air (India) will start its operation Hubli To Bangalore, Delhi (Hindon), Pune, and Tirupati on 15 September The airport is currently being upgraded to an international airport.

Demographics

According to the 2011 census Dharwad district has a population of 1,847,023, roughly equal to the nation of Kosovo or the US state of West Virginia. This gives it a ranking of 256th in India (out of a total of 640). Its population growth rate over the decade 2001–2011 was 15.13%. Dharwad has a sex ratio of 967 females for every 1000 males, and a literacy rate of 80.3%. Scheduled Castes and Scheduled Tribes make up 9.63% and 4.74% of the population respectively.

At the time of the 2011 census, 70.08% of the population spoke Kannada, 18.40% Urdu, 3.16% Marathi, 2.36% Telugu, 1.46% Gujarati and 1.24% Hindi as their first language.

Culture 
According to the modern scholar Hampa Nagarajaiah ("Hampana"), ancient Kannada poet Pampa who is also called Ādikavi ("First Poet") was born in Annigeri, a town in Dharwad district.

The Dharwad district has contributed to some of the greatest exponents of Hindustani music including Sawai Gandharva, Mallikarjun Mansur, Bhimsen Joshi, Basavaraj Rajaguru, Kumar Gandharva and Gangubai Hangal.

Jnanpith Award winners D. R. Bendre, V. K. Gokak and Girish Karnad trace their origins to Dharwad. Kannada writers and critics Kirtinath Kurtakoti and C. P. Siddhashrama are from Dharwad. Noted Marathi writer G. A. Kulkarni also lived most of his life. Actresses Shanta Hublikar and Leena Chandavarkar were born here.

Nandan Nilekani, the Co-Chairman of Infosys moved in with his uncle's family in Dharwad for his education and was a student of St Joseph's High School.

Sucheta Dalal, the Mumbai-based financial journalist, who exposed the Harshad Mehta scandal studied in Dharwad. Lucy d'Abreu (oldest Briton ever) was also born in Dharwad.

Dharwad is also the birthplace of Palwankar Baloo, the first member of the Dalit community to distinguish himself at cricket, and later to become a political activist for Dalit rights. Sunil Joshi, the Indian bowler, also hails from Dharwad.

Dances
Dollu Kunitha

It is a popular drum dance. The large drums are decorated with coloured cloth, and are slung around the necks of men. The dances are at times accompanied with songs relating to religious praise or wars.

 Veeragase

Veeragase is popular folk dance. It is a symbolic presentation of the heroism and valour of God Veerabahadhra. Its exponents are called Lingadevaru and they perform the dance with religious fervour at festival time especially during the months of Shravana and Kartika.

 Nandikolu kunitha

This art form is the domain of male devotees of Lord Siva. The Nandi pole is about 18 cubits in length, each cubit representing a 'dharma'. The length of the pole is fitted with brass pots and plates, and ornate silver or brass umbrella at the top with a silk tassel, which is the flag. The performer on a sling balances the pole; this requires skill as well as strength. The sight of the devotee's inspired dance, to the background beat and the resulting symphony of sounds, from the pots and plates on the pole, is truly breathtaking.

 Jodu halige

Halige meaning two percussion instruments used by two artists to produce rhythmic notes of astounding energy and power. Their movements along the stage expressive of their physical energy harmonizes with the notes produced by the instrument. The Haligi (wood) circular in shape is made of buffalo hide. A short stick is used on it. The notes combined with the bodily movement pervade the stage and overflow to the audience.

 Lambani nruthya

Lambani women dressed colourfully and move circularly with clapping and singing. This dance is out of the common. In dress, mode of living and dwelling, they dance on important festivities in a free manner.

 Veerabhadra kunitha

The dance form depicts the story of Veerabhadra, the legendary minor god created by Lord Siva to teach a lesson to his father-in-law Daksha. Veerabhadra to go to the place of the yaga and destroy the ceremony.

Tourism 
Places of interest in Dharwad district comprise many tourist attractions including temples and historical monuments.

Dharwad 
 Aminbhavi, about 6 km from Dharwad, is the location of 24 Tirthankara Basadi, Hire Matha and a cave temple. Hire Matha has paintings on a wooden plank. The plank is brought in from Kittur.

Hubballi 
 Chandramouleshwara Temple at Unkal is of the Western Chalukya period Chandramouleshwara Shiva temple and Unkal lake.
 Unkal Lake is used as a perfect picnic and has a garden, recreational facilities for children, and boating. The lake is 3 km away from Hubli.

 Bhavanishankar Temple This Chalukyan temple with the image of Sri Narayana is flanked by the ten incarnations of God.
 Asar It was built by Mohammed Ali Shah in about 1646 to serve as a hall of justice. The building was also used to house two hairs from the Prophet's beard. Women are not allowed inside.
 Nrupatunga Hill is a hillock located on the North-Eastern fringe of Hubballi. The top of the hillock has views of Hubli city. The span of the view extends from Amargol in the North to the Airport in the West all the way to the Southern parts of Hubli.

 
 Siddharoodha Math is a religious institution, a centre of Advaita philosophy as preached by Swami Siddharoodha, is located on the outskirts of Hubli.
 Glass House As the name suggests, this is a palace of glass, inaugurated by the former Indian Prime Minister, Smt. Indira Gandhi.
 Banashankari Temple Amargol is known for the Shankarlinga and Banashankari Temple. It is in between Hubli and Dharwad, and near to Navanagar.
 Annigeri has many historical temples including Kalyani Chalukya period Amriteshwara temple. It is about 30 km from Hubli, between Hubli and Gadag.

Sri Jagadguru Ajaatha Nagalinga Swamy Mutta-Navalagunda

 Kundgol is about 15 km from Hubli-Dharwad. It is home to the Shambhulinga temple. It is known for its place in the history of Hindustani Music in Karnataka. Birthplace of Sawai Gandharva. Bharat Ratna Pandit Bhimsen Joshi and Gangubai Hangal learnt Hindustani music here and Sawai Gandharva was their Guru.
Kalghatgi:
 Tamboor about 8 km from Kalghatgi. It home to the Basavanna temple and Devikoppa Forest.
 Shri Basaveshwar Temple is located in Bhogenagarakoppa at a distance of approximately 14 km from Kalghatagi.
 Mahalakshmi temple
 Shantinatha Basadi Jain temple

People, language, customs
Kannada is most spoken language in this district. The Kannada spoken here is known as Dharwad Kannada. This slightly varies from Kannada spoken in southern Karnataka. Men in rural areas wear headgear called a turban or Pheta. Also many wear white cap on their head.

Agriculture and commerce 
Jowar, maize, wheat, cotton, onions and rice are grown. The district also grows mangoes, papaya, and bananas as horticultural produce. There are many subsidiary agricultural industries such as the production of puffed rice, beaten rice, and edible oils.

Notable people 

 
 
 G. S. Amur
 K. S. Amur
 D. R. Bendre
 Kumar Gandharva
 Sawai Gandharva
 Gangubai Hangal
 Shanta Hublikar
 Suresh Heblikar
 R. C. Hiremath
 Bhimsen Joshi
 Girish Karnad
 G. A. Kulkarni
 Sarojini Mahishi
 Mallikarjun Mansur
 Sudha Murthy
 Venkanna H. Naik
 D. C. Pavate
 Basavaraj Rajguru
 C. P. Siddhashrama

See also

References

External links

 Official website

 
Districts of Karnataka
Belgaum division